János Farkas (born 1 January 1984) is a Hungarian football player who currently plays for SV Loipersbach.

References

External links

Profile at HLSZ

1984 births
Living people
People from Jászberény
Hungarian footballers
Hungarian expatriate footballers
Association football forwards
FC Felcsút players
Budaörsi SC footballers
FC Tatabánya players
BFC Siófok players
Soproni VSE players
Mezőkövesdi SE footballers
Rákospalotai EAC footballers
Kazincbarcikai SC footballers
Ceglédi VSE footballers
Hungarian expatriate sportspeople in Austria
Expatriate footballers in Austria
Sportspeople from Jász-Nagykun-Szolnok County